Elmer Horton may refer to:

 Elmer Horton (baseball) (1869–1918), baseball pitcher 
 Elmer G. Horton, head football coach for the Wabash College Little Giants